Swedetown is a small, unincorporated community in Houghton County in the Upper Peninsula of the U.S. state of Michigan. It is south of Calumet and west of Laurium  and the intersection of US 41 and M-26.

It is the site of the Swedetown Cross Country Ski Trails, a system of cross-country skiing and mountain biking trails, sledding and snowboarding  hills.  The trails are the site of the annual Great Bear Chase Ski Race and "Great Deer Chase Mountain Bike Race".

References

Unincorporated communities in Houghton County, Michigan
Unincorporated communities in Michigan
Houghton micropolitan area, Michigan